Cover Magazine is an album by the American band Giant Sand. It was released on Thrill Jockey Records in 2002. Eleven of the songs are covers.

Track listing
"El Paso / Out on the Weekend"	 (Marty Robbins, Neil Young)
"Johnny Hit and Run Pauline"	(Exene Cervenka, John Doe)
"Iron Man" (Geezer Butler, Tony Iommi, Ozzy Osbourne, Bill Ward)
"Human / Lovely Head"	(Goldfrapp, Will Gregory, Locke, Norfolk)
"The Beat Goes On" (Sonny Bono)
"Plants and Rags" (Rob Ellis, PJ Harvey)
"Wayfaring Stranger / Fly Me to the Moon" (Ives, Bart Howard)
"Red Right Hand" (Nick Cave)
"King of the Road" (Roger Miller)
"I'm Leaving Now" (Johnny Cash)
"Blue Marble Girl" (Howe Gelb)
"The Inner Flame" (Rainer Ptacek)
"The Beat Goes On" (Sonny Bono)
"Summertime" (George Gershwin) (bonus track on 25th Anniversary Edition) 
"The Pilgrim (Chapter 33)" (Kris Kristofferson) (bonus track on 25th Anniversary Edition)

Differences between LP and CD
The cover of the vinyl version lists all titles of the CD. However, only the first 10 titles appear on the record. When it was remastered and re-released in 2011, it was sold with a download card for the entire album (including bonus tracks) on mp3.

Personnel
Joey Burns - Upright Bass
Aron Burtch - Drums
Neko Case - Background vocals
John Convertino - Percussion, Drums
Saholy Diavolana - Guitar, Background vocals
Jim Fairchild - Guitar, Bottle
Howe Gelb - Bass, Guitar, Piano, Harp, Sound Effects, Vocals
Sofie Albertsen Gelb - Background vocals 
Aaron Graham - Steel Guitar
Michael Grimes - Upright Bass
PJ Harvey - Vocals
Kelly Hogan - Background vocals
Nick Luca - Guitar
Ari Posner - Congas
Laureline Prod'homme - Bass, Backing Vocals
Kevin Salem - Strings
Noah Thomas - Trumpet
Jacob Valenzuela - Trumpet
Matt Ward - Piano, Vocals

References

2001 albums
Giant Sand albums
Covers albums
Thrill Jockey albums
Fire Records (UK) albums